Sosso-Nakombo is a sub-prefecture in the Central African Republic.

History  
In 1920, after the return to France of Neukamerun, Sosso became chief town of subdivision in the district of Kade-Sangha (Middle Congo).  In 2002, the locality becomes chief town of one of the seven sub-prefectures of Mambéré-Kadeï, resulting from a division of the sub-prefecture of Gamboula.

Administration 
The sub-prefecture consists of the only municipality of Lower Kadéï. The locality of Sosso-Nakombo has 8,900 inhabitants in September 2014, including 100 displaced persons.

References 

Sub-prefectures of the Central African Republic
Populated places in the Central African Republic